Jęczydół  is a village in the administrative district of Gmina Kobylanka, within Stargard County, West Pomeranian Voivodeship, in north-western Poland.

The village has a population of 145 people.

References

Villages in Stargard County